Ascoli Satriano is a town and comune in the province of Foggia in the Apulia region of southeast Italy. It is located on the edge of a large plain in Northern Apulia known as the Tavoliere delle Puglie.

History
The earliest human presence in the area of Ascoli Satriano dates from around the 9th century BC, according to archaeological evidence, and similar dated earthworks are common in the area. The Marbles of Ascoli Satriano are a funerary collection from the 4th century BC. 

Ascoli Satriano (known as Asculum) was a city of the Dauni, a warlike tribe who gave effective help to the Romans at the first Battle of Asculum in 279 BC. The Battle of Canusium also took place nearby. In the Social War the city took the Italian side against Rome, and the end of that war, at the Battle of Asculum (89 BC), the victorious Romans besieged the town, starved it to surrender, executed the adult male prisoners by flogging and decapitation, and burned the town. Those noncombatants who survived were left to wander without support. The Roman general responsible, Gnaeus Pompeius Strabo, gained the nickname Carnifex ("Butcher"). Later Sulla established a military colony there. 

In the Roman period it became a small cluster of habitations in a wider network of scattered villas. Under the Roman Empire the economy was operated by slave labour and focused on grain cultivation. 

As the Western Roman Empire began to collapse in the fourth and fifth centuries, many of the surrounding farms were abandoned with a retraction of cultivation and a re-growth of woodlands. In the mid-9th century the Saracens razed the city. In 1040 it rebelled against the Byzantines and, the following year, a decisive battle was fought nearby which granted the Normans control over southern Italy.  An earthquake in 1456 totally destroyed Ascoli Satriano, and forced relocation of the surviving inhabitants to the site of the current town. Re-growth of the town however was interrupted by periodic outbreaks of plague and typhus into the early 19th Century.

From the end of the nineteenth century the Ascoli Satriano was affected by increasing emigration to the Americas, reaching a peak between 1903 and 1914, stopping during the periods of the First World War and Italian fascism. After the bombing of Foggia in 1943, Ascoli Satriano was freed by British and American forces.

Ascoli Satriano was mentioned by the Irish writer James Joyce in his novel Ulysses.

After the Second World War, Ascoli Satriano, close to Cerignola, was the center of significant labor struggles against landlordism, sharecropping and low wages, and strikes, demonstrations and land occupations became frequent. Trade unionists and politicians made passionate speeches to organize to support the demands of the working classes in Piazza Cecco d'Ascoli (today Piazza Giovanni Paolo II).

Main sights 
The Romanesque-Gothic Cathedral (12th century)
Church of St. John the Baptist (12th century)
Church of the Incoronata (15th century)
The Museum Center of Ascoli Satriano houses the Marbles of Ascoli Satriano, a set of marble artifacts from the 4th century BCE believed to been taken from a tomb of an elite prince of the region.

People 

Biagio Ciotto, American politician.
Michele Placido, actor and film director

References

External links
The Museum Center of Ascoli Satriano 
A late Roman villa at Faragola (Ascoli Satriano), ITALY Dipartimento di Scienze Umane, Area di archeologia - Università degli Studi di Foggia.

Cities and towns in Apulia